The canton of Angers-6 is an administrative division of the Maine-et-Loire department, in western France. It was created at the French canton reorganisation which came into effect in March 2015. Its seat is in Angers.

It consists of the following communes:

Angers (partly)
La Chapelle-Saint-Laud 
Cornillé-les-Caves
Corzé
Huillé-Lézigné
Jarzé-Villages
Marcé
Montreuil-sur-Loir
Rives-du-Loir-en-Anjou
Saint-Barthélemy-d'Anjou
Seiches-sur-le-Loir
Sermaise
Verrières-en-Anjou

References

Cantons of Maine-et-Loire